Violante Beatrice Siries (1709–1783) was an Italian painter. She was born in Florence and studied under Hyacinthe Rigaud and François Boucher in Paris from 1726. Returning later to Florence she married Giuseppe Cerroti and continued her artistic studies under Conti.

Siries was talented in several genres, but established herself as a famous portraitist. She succeeded in gaining the patronage of the Medici family and their financial partners the Gondi family in Florence after the death of Giovanna Fratellini (1731) and travelled to Rome and Vienna to execute commissions.

Her most ambitious work was a fourteen figure family group of the emperor Charles VI, the father of Maria Theresa of Austria (1735), and three of her self-portraits are preserved in the Uffizi Gallery. In later life Siries became a respected teacher and her pupils included Anna Bacherini Piattoli.

At least one of her self-portraits is part of the Uffizi Gallery's collection. She is one of the artists whose art is being worked on being restored by the Advancing Women Artists Foundation. She was also mentioned in Jane Fortune's book Invisible Women: Forgotten Artists of Florence, which discusses female Florentine artists.

Among her paintings :
 The sleeping seamstress (leaning on her sewing box).

 Saint Francis of Assisi

 Young women portrait, circa 1735

 Captain E. Hughes

[[File:Captain Sir Edward Hughes, circa 1720-94 RMG BHC2793.tiff|thumb|Captain Edward Hughes, Oil on canvas, 1761, National Maritime Museum, London]]

 The Virgin Mary presenting the Baby Jesus to Santa Maria Maddalena dei Pazzi : for a better reproduction see 

 Double portrait of Peter Leopold of Habsburg and Maria Luisa if Spain.

References

Further reading

 
 Greer, G.; The Obstacle Race'' (1979)

1709 births
1783 deaths
18th-century Italian painters
Painters from Florence
Italian women painters
18th-century Italian women artists